The Museum of Fine Arts is an art museum in Osijek, Croatia. It was established in 1954.

History 

The history of the Gallery of Fine Arts in Osijek is closely connected to the Museum of Slavonia, from which the collections that later became the starting point for the gallery were detached. Those holdings were established by taking over collections from the bequest of the nobility in the Osijek region; already then counting almost 500 pieces, amongst them many of high European quality. However, the need to be extracted and presented to the public appeared, and in 1948 J. Bösendorfer made the first individual exhibition in a gallery-sense out of the existing material, and mounted it in a building at 24, European Avenue in Osijek. But however, the duration of this exhibition, authored by Josip Leović, was short lived and after only five months all of the exhibits were returned to the museum, since the exhibition area was needed for other purposes. The collections stayed within the holdings of the Museum of Slavonia up until 1952, when rooms are released in the former building of the county, opposite to the Croatian National Theatre. That gallery was designed upon the museum concept of Zdenka Munk and the exhibition was mounted by the artists J. Leović and J. Gojković; and being of a representative character, presented to the Osijek public an institution of a high cultural range. In 1954 the collections are formally detached from the Museum of Slavonia with its first director, the artist Jovan Gojković. Even before that the gallery had published its first catalogue in 1953, drawn up by J. Gojković.

But the gallery, which had just started to show the public its collected artistic wealth, had to yet again leave its facilities and with that abruptly interrupt its work, due to new needs for the space it inhabited. The gallery was thus shut down in 1955 and its collections, now numbering well over 1000 pieces, were placed into storage in places and attics often not suited for this purpose. The gallery though, as an independent institution, was not eliminated; its administration was placed within the Musical School. In the meantime, after the death of J. Gojković in 1957 his place as director was filled by Drago Dodigović, an art-historian.

Individual exhibitions from the gallery collections were vivid signs of its survival, and as such paid attention to the artistic wealth of the gallery, which also bore fruit, especially after the initiative of the painter and academic Ljubo Babić. It was no longer possible to keep such vast and precious collections hidden and scattered, so the building at 9th European Avenue was adapted and the gallery finally had a proper space to present its collections to the public. The gallery opened to the public in 1964 and at the same time a catalogue was printed with a foreword, catalogue data and reproductions. This became the constant residence of the gallery, with the name it bears today.

Unfortunately, the spatial capacities of the building which the gallery inhabits no longer fill the need of today's dynamic and expansive exhibition program, as the curators of today face the problem of fitting both temporary and permanent exhibitions into one and same space.

References

External links 

 Official web-site 

F
1954 establishments in Croatia